Zuidland is a town in the Dutch province of South Holland. It is a part of the municipality of Nissewaard, and lies about 6 km west of Spijkenisse.

In 2005, the town of Zuidland had 5192 inhabitants, they are called "Slandenaren". The built-up area of the town was 0.87 km², and contained 1878 residences. The wider statistical district of Zuidland, which also covers the "Polder Zuidland", has a population of around 5130.

Zuidland was a separate municipality until 1980, when it became part of Bernisse.

Gallery

References

External links

Populated places in South Holland
Former municipalities of South Holland
Nissewaard